Earnest Hunter III (born December 21, 1970) is a former American football running back. He played college football at Southeastern Oklahoma State. He was originally signed as an undrafted free agent by the Cleveland Browns.

College career
Hunter originally attended Navarro College from 1991 to 1992 before transferring to Southeastern Oklahoma State University where he set the Oklahoma Intercollegiate Conference records for rushing yards (1,899) and touchdowns (16) in 1994.

Professional career
Hunter signed as an undrafted free agent with the Cleveland Browns in 1995. As a rookie, he appeared in 10 games, rushing the ball 30 times for 100 yards catching five passes for 42 yards. He also returned 23 kickoffs for 508 yards as well as 3 punts for 40 yards. He also fumbled four times. In 1996, he started the season with the newly relocated Baltimore Ravens appearing in five games, rushing the ball one time for no yards and catching one pass for 25 yards. He also returned nine kickoffs for 178 yards and also two fumbles.  He finished the season with the New Orleans Saints appearing in six games rushing the ball 14 times for 44 yards, catching 17 pass for 138 yards. He also attempted one pass. He returned one kickoff for 20 yards and fumbled twice more for the 1996 season.

In 1998, Hunter joined the Barcelona Dragons of NFL Europe. On the season, he appeared in 10 games, rushing the ball 87 times for 304 yards and two touchdowns. His yardage total was good for ninth in the league. He also caught 22 passes for 134 yards. Hunter now works as a study hall teacher at The Brook Hill School in Bullard Texas.

Personal life
Hunter's father died when he was seven years old. His mother then began working multiple jobs to help support their family.
Hunter became a father while attending Longview High School.

References

1970 births
Living people
American football running backs
Cleveland Browns players
Baltimore Ravens players
New Orleans Saints players
Barcelona Dragons players
Players of American football from Texas
People from Longview, Texas